The Broadly Applicable Tracking System, or BATS, is a small, lightweight tool that scientists use to track animal movements. It is shaped like a backpack and glued onto the back of a bat or other small animal. It contains GPS and wireless internet equipment that allow the scientists track the animal's movements.

The scientists who invented BATS differentiate it from other systemss because it is lighter, requires less power, and can track animals even inside caves or hollow trees. BATS can be made on a 3D printer, and it is so light that it does not slow down small bats when they fly.

BATS falls off the animal's back after about fourteen days.  Scientists then collect fallen BATS to reuse the parts.

Scientists have used BATS to show that vampire bats form social bonds when being kept by humans that they remember after being released.

Name

Scientists named the tool "broadly applicable tracking system" because they believe it can be used in a broad range of animals: bats, rodents, amphibians and reptiles.As of April 2020, BATS has only been used on bats.

Invention

The team that invented BATS includes scientists from the Museum of Natural History in Berlin and universities in Germany and Ohio State University.

References

Bats
Technology